Alan William Lillington  (born 4 September 1932) is a British sprinter. He competed in the men's 100 metres at the 1952 Summer Olympics. He represented England in the sprint disciplines at the 1954 British Empire and Commonwealth Games in Vancouver, Canada.

Lillington studied Medicine at Durham University. He later became a consultant paediatrician in Sunderland and was awarded the MBE IN 1995. He is the father of former rugby player Peter Lillington.

Competition record

References

External links
 

1932 births
Living people
Athletes (track and field) at the 1952 Summer Olympics
Athletes (track and field) at the 1954 British Empire and Commonwealth Games
British male sprinters
English male sprinters
Olympic athletes of Great Britain
Place of birth missing (living people)
Commonwealth Games competitors for England
Alumni of King's College, Newcastle